Patriarch Spyridon (secular name Anastasios Efthimiou) was Greek Orthodox Patriarch of Antioch (1891–1898).

Literature
 
 Якушев М. И. Первый Патриарх-араб на Антиохийском престоле // Восточный архив, 2006. — No. 14-15. — С. 99-106

External links
 Primates of the Apostolic See of Antioch

Greek Orthodox Patriarchs of Antioch
19th-century Eastern Orthodox bishops